Ian Brendan Robinson (born 25 August 1978) is an English former professional footballer who played in the Football League for Mansfield Town.

References

1978 births
Living people
English footballers
Association football midfielders
English Football League players
Mansfield Town F.C. players
Ilkeston Town F.C. (1945) players
Hednesford Town F.C. players
Northwich Victoria F.C. players
Alfreton Town F.C. players
Worksop Town F.C. players
Grantham Town F.C. players
Hucknall Town F.C. players